Go Bus Christchurch Ltd. is a bus company owned by Go Bus Transport Ltd. The company started off as Christchurch Bus Services Ltd in 2004. 

In November 2010, it was sold to Go Bus Ltd after it was found that Christchurch Bus Services had failed to maintain vehicles and put commuters in danger.

Routes
Go Bus Christchurch operate all routes previously operated by Christchurch Bus Services under the Metro brand:

History

Christchurch Bus Services
Christchurch Bus Services Ltd operated Metro routes for Environment Canterbury, and private charter services for groups and schools. It was purchased in December 2010 by Go Bus Transport, of Hamilton, New Zealand.

Timaru operations
Christchurch Bus Services previously operated in Timaru, South Canterbury through its subsidiary Timaru Bus Services, before terminating the contract with 18 months left, due to financial issues. Ritchies Transport gained the five Timaru routes.

Operation Otautahi Waka
Operation Otautahi Waka ('Christchurch transport') was a commercial vehicle check on buses conducted by the New Zealand Police on 18 November 2010. Christchurch Bus Services Ltd had four buses ordered off the road, which resulted in it being unable to operate a number of routes. These buses returned to duty the following day after repairs. Redbus and Leopard also had buses ordered off the road. Environment Canterbury gave Christchurch Bus Services until 5pm, 19 November 2010 to complete sale negotiations or lose their contracts for a number of routes. After CBS was sold, it was ruled an illegal action on the part of Environment Canterbury by the Courts and CBS owners received the money owed.

Purchase of Leopard urban bus
In July 2013 Gobus Transport took over the urban operations of Leopard Coachlines, gaining around 90 buses.

References

External links
 Go Bus Transport Ltd website
 Metro website
 Environment Canterbury

Bus companies of New Zealand
Companies based in Christchurch
Public transport in Christchurch
2004 establishments in New Zealand
2010 mergers and acquisitions